Dolomitization is a geological process by which the carbonate mineral dolomite is formed when magnesium ions replace calcium ions in another carbonate mineral, calcite. It is common for this mineral alteration into dolomite to take place due to evaporation of water in the sabkha area. Dolomitization involves substantial amount of recrystallization. This process is described by the stoichiometric equation:

2 CaCO3(calcite) + Mg2+ ↔ CaMg(CO3)2(dolomite) + Ca2+

Dolomitization depends on specific conditions which include low Ca:Mg ratio in solution, reactant surface area, the mineralogy of the reactant, high temperatures which represents the thermodynamic stability of the system, and the presence of kinetic inhibitors such as sulfate.

If the kinetic inhibitors and high temperatures are compatible, then dolomitization can take place in saline environments above thermodynamic and kinetic saturation with respect to dolomite. This type of environment includes, freshwater and seawater mixing zones, normal saline to hypersaline subtidal environments, schizohaline environments (fluctuating salinity: fresh-water to hypersaline conditions) and hypersaline supratidal environments. When requirements are fulfilled, dolomitization can take place in alkaline environments which are those under the influence of bacterial reduction and fermentation processes, and areas with high input alkaline continental groundwaters. Environments with high temperatures (about 50 °C) such as subsurface and hydrothermal environments are conducive to dolomitization.

See also
 Diagenesis
 Dolomite (rock)

Notes

References
 
 
 
 

Dolomite group
Calcite group
Geological processes
Inorganic reactions
Mineralogy
Dolomite (rock)